Francis Patrick Murphy  (April 6, 1876 – November 4, 1912) was an American outfielder in Major League Baseball who played for the Boston Beaneaters and New York Giants in 1901. He went to college at Fordham University. Murphy was 25 years old when he broke into the big leagues on July 2, 1901, with the Boston Beaneaters.

References

External links 

Baseball players from New York (state)
1876 births
1912 deaths
Major League Baseball outfielders
Major League Baseball second basemen
Boston Beaneaters players
New York Giants (NL) players
New London Whalers players
Derby Angels players
New Haven Blues players
Fordham Rams baseball players
Norwich Reds players
Hartford Senators players
Rock Island Islanders players
Los Angeles Angels (minor league) players
People from Mount Pleasant, New York
People from Central Islip, New York
Burials at Sleepy Hollow Cemetery